Portulaca filsonii  (common names - Sedopsis, Pink Rock-wort) is a plant in the Portulacaceae family, endemic to central Australia in  the Northern Territory. 

It was first described by James Hamlyn Willis in 1975 from a specimen collected in Kings Canyon.  The holotype, MEL 501441 and isotype, MEL 501455, were both collected by Willis in 1966. The name accepted by the Council of Heads of Australasian Herbaria is the later name of Sedopsis filsonii, created as a new combination by Willis in 1977.

The species epithet, filsonii, honours Rex Bertram Filson.

Portulaca filsonii is listed as "Near Threatened" under the TPWCA Act.

Description 
Portulaca filsonii is a prostrate, succulent perennial plant. It has a swollen root, and its leaves are opposite. The flowers have a tubular corolla with four pink spreading lobes. There are two partially fused sepals.

References

External links 

 Sedopsis filsonii occurrence data from the Australasian Virtual Herbarium

Flora of the Northern Territory
Plants described in 1975
filsonii
Taxa named by James Hamlyn Willis